Tasmabrochus is a genus of Australian tangled nest spiders first described by V. T. Davies in 2002.  it contains only three species.

References

Amaurobiidae
Araneomorphae genera
Spiders of Australia
Taxa named by Valerie Todd Davies